Lieutenant General James Michael Dubik (U.S. Army, Ret.) is a senior fellow at the Institute for the Study of War and a professor at Georgetown University's Security Studies Program. General Dubik has extensive operational experience in Iraq, Afghanistan, Japan, Korea, Thailand, Bosnia, Haiti, Panama, Honduras, and in many NATO countries.

His last job on active duty was as commanding general of the Multinational Security Transition Command-Iraq (MNSTC-I) and the NATO Training Mission-Iraq in 2007–2008. He is a member of the U.S. Army Ranger Hall of Fame and a distinguished member of the U.S. Army 75th Ranger Regiment.

General Dubik taught philosophy at West Point and campaign theory and practice at the U.S. Army School of Advanced Military Studies, Fort Leavenworth, Kansas.  He has completed an MIT fellowship program for national security studies as well as executive programs in national security at Harvard's JFK School of Government and Syracuse University's Maxwell School of Citizenship and Public Affairs. He is the author, most recently, of Just War Reconsidered: Strategy, Ethics, and Theory.

Education 
Born on December 6, 1949, Dubik is a 1967 graduate of Cathedral Preparatory School in Erie, Pennsylvania. In 1971, he received a B.A. degree in philosophy from Gannon University in Erie. Dubik later received an M.A. degree in philosophy from Johns Hopkins University and a master's degree in Military Arts and Sciences from the Army Command and General Staff College at Fort Leavenworth, Kansas. After retiring from active duty, he completed a Ph.D. degree in philosophy at Johns Hopkins University in August 2014. His doctoral thesis was entitled Waging War: Filling the Gap in Just War Theory.

Military career 
Dubik served as commanding general for the Multi National Security Transition Command-Iraq.

Other command assignments include the 5th Battalion of the 14th Infantry Regiment, the 2nd Brigade of the 10th Mountain Division, and the 25th Infantry Division.

He taught philosophy at the United States Military Academy.

His military decorations include the Distinguished Service Medal, Defense Superior Service Medal, four awards of the Legion of Merit and five awards of the Meritorious Service Medal.

Dubik retired from the Army in 2008. He was inducted into the U.S. Army Ranger Hall of Fame in 2012.

Civilian career
Dubik currently serves as the senior fellow at the Institute for the Study of War.  He has written for various journals, including Foreign Policy magazine.

Selected works 
 Waging War and Using Force. Naval Institute Press, forthcoming.
 Just War Reconsidered: Strategy, Ethics, and Theory. Lexington, Kentucky : University Press of Kentucky, 2018.  
 Accelerating Combat Power in Afghanistan. 2009. 
 Has Warfare Changed?: Sorting Apples from Oranges. Arlington, Va: Institute of Land Warfare, Association of the United States Army, 2002. 
 The Army's "Twofer": The Dual Role of the Interim Force. Arlington, Va: Institute of Land Warfare, Association of the United States Army, 2001. 
 With Gordon R. Sullivan. Envisioning Future Warfare 1995. Reissued in 2003.

Personal life 
Dubik lives in Arlington, Virginia.

References 

1949 births
Living people
Gannon University alumni
United States Army Rangers
Johns Hopkins University alumni
United States Army Command and General Staff College alumni
Recipients of the Meritorious Service Medal (United States)
United States Military Academy faculty
Recipients of the Legion of Merit
United States Army generals
Recipients of the Defense Superior Service Medal
Recipients of the Distinguished Service Medal (US Army)
American writers